Morgul, Morgûl, or Morgül may refer to:

 Morgûl, a noun translating as "sorcery" in J. R. R. Tolkien's fictional language of Sindarin, from mor, meaning "dark" or "black", and gûl, meaning "magic" (lit. "black magic").
 Morgul, a Norwegian symphonic black metal band named after the above term.
 Minas Morgûl ("Tower of Sorcery"), a fictional fortified city in Tolkien's Middle Earth.
 A Morgul-blade, a magical dagger associated with the city, see list of Middle-earth weapons and armour.
 Minas Morgul, an atmospheric black metal album by Summoning based on Tolkien's legendarium.
 Morgul (rural locality), a rural locality (a selo) in Sretensky District of Zabaykalsky Krai, Russia.
 Morgul-Bismark, a cycling route in Colorado.
 İbrahim Yılmaz Morgül, a Turkish singer.